The Nganasans (Nganasan:  ŋənəhsa(nəh),  ńæh) are a Uralic people of the Samoyedic branch native to the Taymyr Peninsula in north Siberia. In the Russian Federation, they are recognized as one of the indigenous peoples of the Russian North. They reside primarily in the settlements of Ust-Avam, Volochanka, and Novaya in the Taymyrsky Dolgano-Nenetsky District of Krasnoyarsk Krai, with smaller populations residing in the towns of Dudinka and Norilsk as well.

The Nganasans are thought to be the direct descendants of proto-Uralic peoples. However there is some evidence that they absorbed local Paleo-Siberian population. The Nganasans were traditionally a semi-nomadic people whose main form of subsistence was wild reindeer hunting, in contrast to the Nenets, who herded reindeer. Beginning in the early 17th century, the Nganasans were subjected to the yasak system of Czarist Russia. They lived relatively independently, until the 1970s, when they were settled in the villages they live in today, which are at the southern edges of the Nganasans' historical nomadic routes.

There is no certainty as to the exact number of Nganasans living in Russia today. The 2002 Russian census counted 862 Nganasans living in Russia, 766 of whom lived in the former Taymyr Autonomous Okrug. However, those who study the Nganasan estimate their population to comprise approximately 1000 people. Historically, the Nganasan language and a Taymyr Pidgin Russian were the only languages spoken among the Nganasan, but with increased education and village settlement, Russian has become the first language of many Nganasans. Some Nganasans live in villages with a Dolgan majority, such as Ust'-Avam. The Nganasan language is considered seriously endangered and it is estimated that at most 500 Nganasan can speak the Nganasan language, with very limited proficiency among those eighteen and younger.

Etymology

The Nganasans first referred to themselves in Russian as Samoyeds, but they would also often use this term when referring to the Enets people and instead refer to themselves as “Avam people.” For the Nganasans, the term signified ngano-nganasana, which means “real people” in the Nganasan language, and referred to both themselves and the neighboring Madu Enets. However, in their own language, the Avam Nganasans refer to themselves as nya-tansa, which translates as “comrade tribe,” whereas the Vadeyev Nganasans to the East prefer to refer to themselves as a'sa which means “brother,” but also Evenk or Dolgan. The Nganasans were also formerly called Tavgi Samoyeds or Tavgis initially by the Russians, which derives from the word tavgy in the Nenets language. Following the Russian Revolution, the Nganasans adopted their current appellation.

Geography

The Nganasans are the northernmost ethnic group of the Eurasian continent and the Russian Federation, historically inhabiting the tundra of the Taymyr Peninsula. The areas they inhabited stretched over an area of more than 100,000 square kilometers, from the Golchikha River in the west to the Khatanga Bay in the east, and from Lake Taymyr in the north to the Dudypta River in the south. The hunting areas of the Nganasan often coincided with those of the Dolgans and Enets to their east and west respectively. In the winter, they resided in the south of the peninsula at the edge of the Arctic tree line, and during the summer they followed wild reindeer up to 400 miles to the north, sometimes even reaching as far as the Byrranga Mountains.

History

Origins
The homeland of the Proto-Uralic peoples, including the Samoyeds, is suggested to be somewhere near the Ob and Yenisey river drainage areas of Central Siberia or near Lake Baikal.

The Nganasan are considered by most ethnographers who study them to have arisen as an ethnic group when Samoyedic peoples migrated to the Taymyr Peninsula from the south, encountering Paleo-Siberian peoples living there who they then assimilated into their culture. One group of Samoyedic people intermarried with Paleo-Siberian peoples living between the Taz and Yenisei rivers, forming a group that the Soviet ethnographer B.O. Dolgikh refers to as the Samoyed-Ravens. Another group intermarried with the Paleo-Siberian inhabitants of the Pyasina River and formed another group which he called the Samoyed-Eagles. Subsequently, a group of Tungusic people migrated to the region near Lake Pyasino and the Avam River, where they were absorbed into Samoyed culture, forming a new group called the Tidiris. There was another group of Tungusic peoples called the Tavgs who lived along the basins of the Khatanga and Anabar rivers and came into contact with the aforementioned Samoyedic peoples, absorbing their language and creating their own Tavg Savoyedic dialect. It is known that the ancestors of the Nganasan previously inhabited territory further south from a book in the city Mangazeya that lists yasak (fur tribute) payments by the Nganasan which were made in sable, an animal that does not inhabit the tundra where the Nganasan now live.

By the middle of the 17th century, Tungusic peoples began to push the Samoyedic peoples northward towards the tundra Taymyr Peninsula, where they merged into one tribe called "Avam Nganasans". As the Tavgs were the largest Samoyedic group at the time of this merger, their dialect formed the basis of the present-day Nganasan language. In the late 19th century, a Tungusic group called the Vanyadyrs also moved to the Eastern Taymyr peninsula, where they were absorbed by the Avam Nganasans, resulting in the tribe that is now called Vadeyev Nganasans. In the 19th century, a member of the Dolgans, a Turkic people who lived east of the Nganasans, was also absorbed by the Nganasans, and his descendants formed an eponymous clan, which today, though linguistically fully Samoyedic, is still acknowledged as being Dolgan in origin.

Contact with Russians
The Nganasans first came into contact with Russians sometime in the early 17th century, and after some resistance, began to pay tribute to the Czar in the form of sable fur under the yasak system in 1618. Tribute collectors established themselves at the “Avam Winter Quarters,” at the confluence of the Avam River and Dudypta River rivers, which is the site of the modern-day settlement Ust'-Avam. The Nganasans often tried to avoid paying yasak by changing the names that they provided to the Russians. Relations between the Russians and Nganasans were not always peaceful. In 1666, the Nganasans ambushed and killed yasak collectors, soldiers, tradesmen, and their interpreters on three occasions, stealing the sable furs and property belonging to them. Over the course of the year, 35 men were killed in total.

The Nganasan had little direct contact with merchants and, unlike most indigenous Siberians, they were never baptized or contacted by missionaries. Some Nganasans traded directly with the Russians, while others did so via the Dolgans. They usually exchanged sable furs for alcohol, tobacco, tea, and various tools, products which quickly integrated themselves into Nganasan culture. In the 1830s, and again from 1907 to 1908, Russian contact caused major smallpox outbreaks among the Ngansans.

Soviet Union

The Nganasans first came into contact with the Soviets around in the 1930s, when the government instituted a program of collectivization. The Soviets had established that 11% of families owned 60 percent of the deer, while the lower 66% owned only 17 percent, and remedied this by collectivizing reindeer property into kolkhoz around which the Nganasan then settled. This represented a great change in lifestyle, as the Nganasan, who had primarily been reindeer hunters, were forced to expand their small stock of domesticated reindeer that had previously only been primarily for transport or eaten during periods of famine. Additionally, the Soviets took a greater interest in the Nganasans as a people, and starting in the 1930s, ethnographers began to study their customs.

Despite collectivization and the institution of the kolkhoz, the Nganasans were able to maintain a semi-nomadic lifestyle following domesticated reindeer herds up until the early 1970s, when the state settled the Nganasans along with the Dolgans and Enets in three different villages it constructed: Ust'-Avam, Volochanka, and Novaya. Nganasan kolkhoz were combined to create the villages, and after settling in them, the Nganasans shifted from employment in kolkhozes to working for gospromkhoz Taymirsky, the government hunting enterprise, which supplied meat to the burgeoning industrial center Norilsk to the southwest. By 1978, all domestic reindeer herding had ceased, and with new Soviet equipment, the yield of wild reindeer reached 50,000 in the 1980s. Most Nganasan men were employed as hunters, and the women worked as teachers or as seamstresses decorating reindeer boots. Nganasan children began schooling in Russian, and even pursuing secondary education. The Soviet planned economy benefited the Nganasan by providing their settlements with adequate wages, machinery, consumer goods, and education, allowing the Nganasan to achieve a relatively high standard of living by the end of the 1980s.

Religion
The traditional religion of the Nganasans is animistic and shamanistic. Their religion is a particularly well preserved example of Siberian Shamanism, which remained relatively free of foreign influence due to the Nganasans' geographic isolation until recent history. Because of their isolation, shamanism was a living phenomenon in the lives of the Nganasans, even into the beginning of the 20th century. The last notable Nganasan shaman's seances were recorded on film by anthropologists in the 1970s.

Language
The Nganasan language (formerly called тавгийский, tavgiysky, or тавгийско-самоедский, tavgiysko-samoyedsky in Russian; from the ethnonym тавги, tavgi) is a moribund Samoyedic language spoken by the Nganasan people. It is now considered highly endangered, as most Nganasan people now speak Russian, rather than their native language. In 2010 it was estimated that only 125 Nganasan people can speak it in the southwestern and central parts of the Taymyr Peninsula.

Genetics 
The characteristic genetic marker of the Nganasans and some other Eastern Siberians is haplogroup N1c1-Tat (Y-DNA). Other Samoyedic peoples mainly have more N1с2-P43, rather than N1c1, suggesting a bottleneck event. Haplogroup N originated in the northern part of China in 20,000–25,000 years BP and spread to north Eurasia, through Siberia to Northern Europe through drift and bottleneck events. Subgroup N1c1 is frequently seen in non-Samoyedic peoples, N1c2 in Samoyedic peoples. In addition, haplogroup Z (mtDNA), found with low frequency in Saami, Finns, and Siberians, is related to the migration of people speaking Uralic languages.

In 2019, a study based on genetics, archaeology and linguistics suggests that Uralic speakers arrived in the Baltic region from Western Siberia, at the beginning of the Iron Age some 2,500 years ago. Prior to that, the early Uralic speakers were hunter-gatherers which underwent geneflow from eastern Siberians (samplified by Evens and Evenks), which is maximized today among Nganasans. The remainder ancestry is derived from Ancient North Eurasians, a deeply European-related population of Paleolithic Siberia.

In another genetic study in 2019, published in the European Journal for Human Genetics Nature, it was found that the Nganasans also display significant Ancient North Eurasians ancestry, next to their predominant Eastern Siberian ancestry (shared with Northeast Asians), linking them to other Uralic-speaking populations.

See also
 Soviet Treatment of Siberian Minorities

Notes

References

Bibliography

External links
 
 Helimski, Eugene (1997). "Factors of Russianization in Siberia and Linguo-Ecological Strategies" in Senri Ethnological Studies no. 44: Northern minority languages: Problems of survival, National Museum of Ethnology.
 Kolga, Margus et al. (1993). "Nganasans" in The Red Book of the Peoples of the Russian Empire.
 
 
 
 Trailer for the Russian film "People of Taimyr" (ЛЮДИ ТАЙМЫРА)
 Russian documentary "Taboo: The Last Shaman" (Табу Последний Шаман)

Ethnic groups in Russia
Ancient peoples
Ethnic groups in Siberia
Indigenous peoples of North Asia
Samoyedic peoples
Indigenous small-numbered peoples of the North, Siberia and the Far East
Modern nomads